Langley School is an HMC independent co educational day, weekly, flexi and full boarding school situated near the market town of Loddon in South Norfolk, England. The current headmaster is Jon Perriss, who has been in post since 2019, and the school is a member of the Society of Heads. Termly fees are currently £5,087 for day pupils, £8,624 for weekly boarders and £10,337 for full boarders.

History

Langley Hall is a red-brick, Palladianstyle house, built in 1737 for Richard Berney on land originally belonging to Langley Abbey. In 1744 the estate was inherited by Sir William Beauchamp and remained in his family until the 20th century. The hall is set in grounds laid out by Capability Brown, with an extensive spread of daffodils which are opened to the public on "Daffodil Day" each spring.

In 1910, the Education Committee of Norwich made the decision to amalgamate the middle schools in the city with the Municipal and Presbyterian schools, with all boys to attend a new City of Norwich School, which was to be built at Eaton.  Jeremiah George Chapman was offered a post at the new school, but determined instead to found a school of his own, with boarding provision for those boys could not travel to Norwich each day.

Having established his school as the Norwich High School for Boys at St. Giles, Chapman died in September 1936 and was replaced by John Jevons. Under Jevons, the school moved to Langley Hall at Langley Park, near Loddon, and changed its name. Jevons retired in 1965 and was replaced by C.D. Young. Young oversaw the introduction of co-education at Langley with the arrival of three girls in the sixth form in 1978.

Young's successor, James McArthur, saw the number of girls jump from 3 to 40; the school was fully co-educational by 1990. In his turn, McArthur's successor, James Malcolm, doubled the size of the school in his ten-year term of office. The current headmaster, Dominic Findlay, joined the school in 2007 from Wymondham College.

Curriculum

The school offers a broad and balanced curriculum; in addition to the core subjects of English (language and literature), mathematics and the sciences, subjects taught include humanities, media studies, modern languages (French, German and Spanish), social sciences and technology. There is also provision for RS, PSE, and PE and games throughout the school.

Pupils in the senior school study for GCSEs in years 10 and 11, and for 'A' levels in the lower and upper sixth forms.

Almost all senior pupils move to higher educational institutions after 'A' level.

Sport

The principal sports are Rugby football and cricket for boys and hockey and netball for girls. Minor sports include association football, athletics basketball, equestrianism, golf, polo and skiing.

The school has several cricket, football and rugby pitches, and there is an AstroTurf hockey pitch. Langley operates a polo academy.

Extra-curricular activities

Academic lessons end at 3.45pm each day, allowing students a short break before engaging in their chosen extra-curricular activities. The school offers a range of activities, including CCF, debating, DoE, history, kayaking, rock climbing, sailing, yoga and Young Enterprise. Many activities involve expert visiting staff.

The activities programme changes at the end of each term and, at the end of each year, students complete questionnaires with their opinions on current activities and offer suggestions for the future.

Music tuition is available on a variety of instruments, and pupils regularly play in concerts and cabarets. Drama is offered both as an academic subject and an extra curricular activity, with pupils mounting several productions during the year. The BBC newsreader and children's author, Zeb Soanes taught speech and drama at the school before joining the BBC.

Boarding

The school accepts students aged 10 to 18 (Year 6 to Year 13). There are some weekly boarders who live relatively nearby, but the majority are full boarders, including a large number from overseas.

Accommodation
There is separate accommodation for boys and girls, with communal social facilities. The boys live in the main hall in rooms for up to six students, divided into individual units. Senior students have single and double study bedrooms.

The girls live in Salisbury House (the former stable block) which has mostly single and double rooms. Salisbury has its own common room and limited kitchen and laundry facilities.

Staffing
There are 13 resident teachers and matrons.

Preparatory School
The prep school accepts children aged 2 to 13 (Nursery to Year 8). In 2009, it merged with adjacent Thorpe House School, which had provided girls-only education for 100 years.

In early May 2016, the governors of Langley School announced that the prep school would merge with Taverham Hall Preparatory School. The announcement was initially greeted with anger in some quarters and the Charity Commission sent inspectors to the school in July that year, citing "regulatory concerns". Langley's prep-school site, Thorpe House, was sold to developers and the merger was completed for the beginning of the Autumn term, 2016.

More about the school

The new school's home is in Taverham Hall, a neo-Jacobean mansion built in 1858 and purchased from the Mickelthwait family by Rev'd Frank Glass in 1921.

The curriculum in the prep school is broadly based on the National Curriculum, but includes Latin / Classical civilisation for all pupils, and French for some. All pupils study ICT, DT and music. Almost all pupils progress from the prep school to the senior school.

Notable alumni

Former pupils of the school are known as Icenians, and include:
 Sir John Mills (1926); actor
 Allen Clarke (1928): educationalist; first headmaster of Holland Park School
 Frederic Jevons (1948): biochemist; Vice-chancellor of Deakin University
 Christopher Borrett (1997): cricketer.
 Ben Pienaar (2004): professional rugby player

See also

 Langley Preparatory School at Taverham Hall

References

External links
 Geograph - Picture of Langley Hall
 Joint Schools home page
 Senior School home page
 Old Icenians home page

Educational institutions established in 1910
Boarding schools in Norfolk
Private schools in Norfolk
People educated at Langley School, Loddon
1910 establishments in England